Attayampatti is a panchayat town located southwest to the Salem City in Salem district, Tamil Nadu, India.

Demographics

Population  
 India census, Attayampatti had a population of 12,867. Males constitute 52% of the population and females 48%. Attayampatti has an average literacy rate of 64%, which is higher than the national average of 59.5%, with 58% of the males and 42% of females being literate. Of the population, 11% is under 6 years of age.

Government and politics

Civic Utility / Amenities / Services  
Public health centre (Government Hospital) is located at Nainampatty. Police Station and Post Office are available. 
Its Postal Index Number is 637501. STD code is 0427.

Economy 
The main occupation of the town is Weaving. The town also has several textile mills.

Culture/Cityscape

Cuisine  
Attayampatti is known for its murukku, a snack made of rice flour. Most of the residents in the town make murukku and sell it in front of their house.

Education 
The town has two separate government schools for boys and girls. There are 3 more Private schools here.

References

Cities and towns in Salem district